The Veterans Home Chapel is located in King, Waupaca County, Wisconsin on the grounds of the Wisconsin Veterans Home. It was added to the National Register of Historic Places in 1985.

History
The chapel was established by the Grand Army of the Republic. It is part of the Wisconsin Veterans Home complex and is in the Veterans Cottages Historic District.

References

Properties of religious function on the National Register of Historic Places in Wisconsin
Chapels in the United States
Queen Anne architecture in Wisconsin
Buildings and structures in Waupaca County, Wisconsin
National Register of Historic Places in Waupaca County, Wisconsin